is a 2017 novel written by Japanese writer Haruki Murakami. An English translation by Philip Gabriel and Ted Goossen was released as a single, 704-page volume on 9 October 2018 by Alfred A. Knopf in the US and by Harvill Secker in the UK.

The publisher of the book stated that 1.3 million copies were planned for the first-edition Japanese prints.

Plot 
The protagonist is an unnamed portrait painter whose wife leaves him at the start of the book. Devastated, he quits portrait painting and goes on a long road trip. In the middle of his road trip he meets a nervous woman in a diner who seems to be running away from someone. The protagonist suspects that she is running away from a man who sits nearby while they eat. The protagonist nicknames this man as the man with the white Subaru Forester. The woman and the protagonist  end up going to a love hotel and having violent sex. The next day, he wakes up and she is already gone. He goes back to the diner and sees the man with the white Subaru again and he feels as though the man knows exactly what he did with the nervous woman at the love hotel.

The protagonist's road trip comes to an end when his car breaks down. He then moves into the remote house of his friend's father, Tomohiko Amada, a renowned painter who has been moved to a nursing home. There in the attic he discovers an owl living in it and an unknown painting by Tomohiko, Killing Commendatore, depicting a scene from the opera Don Giovanni. He starts working as an art teacher to make ends meet in the village. Meanwhile, a wealthy neighbour, Wataru Menshiki, offers him a very large sum of money to paint his portrait which he eventually agrees to do. He ends up creating a portrait unlike anything he has done before and it inspires him to begin a portrait of the man with the white Subaru.

One night he hears a bell ringing and enlists Menshiki to help him locate the source of the sound. The sound of the bell is coming from a pile of heavy rocks behind a shrine in the woods. Menshiki hires a construction crew to remove the rocks and they uncover a man-made pit with well-constructed stone walls about nine-feet high. There is nothing in the pit except the bells which they remove. As their relationship grows, Menshiki reveals to the protagonist that he purchased his house in order to spy on a young teen, Mariye Akigawa, who he suspects is his daughter. Meanwhile, the source of the bell ringing - an "Idea"  - reveals itself to the protagonist as a two-foot tall, apparently flesh and blood, copy of the character Commendatore from Tomohiko's painting. The Commendatore and the protagonist visit Menshiki's house to view his newly completed portrait (although Menshiki is unable to see the Commandatore). Menshiki then requests that the protagonist paint a portrait of Mariye, who is a student in his art class, so that Menshiki will be able to “accidentally” meet her. The protagonist begins to paint Mariye and also begins a painting of the pit. He stops work on the painting of man with the white Subaru, feeling that the portrait is ominously demanding that he stop. He ends up placing the painting of the man with the white Subaru against the wall so that it is somewhat hidden from sight. Menshiki drops by during one of the painting sessions with Mariye, and he soon takes up a relationship with Mariye's aunt (who has taken care of Mariye after her mother's sudden death by hornets and chaperones the painting sessions). Meanwhile, Mariye goes missing (later it is revealed that she had become suspicious of Menshiki and broke into his house but was unable to leave his house undetected for four days.)

Desperate to find Mariye and feeling that her disappearance is related to the pit, the protagonist asks the Commendatore to tell him Mariye's location. The Commendatore tells him that as an idea he is restricted in what he can say. The Commendatore says that he needs to accept the next invitation he receives no matter what and that it may or may not lead to a clue regarding Mariye's whereabouts. The protagonist accepts an invitation to meet Tomohiko Amada in the nursing home. He ends up re-enacting the scene from Tomohiko's painting, killing the miniature Commendatore with a fishing knife. Once he kills the Commendatore, a door is opened to another world by Long Face (another character from the painting) and the protagonist journeys to a metaphorical underworld in order to rescue Mariye. After emerging from the underworld, he is trapped in the pit for several days and Menshiki rescues him. The girl is able to escape undetected from the house. At the end of the book, he reconciles with his estranged wife, who is heavily pregnant and with whom he has not physically met in a year.

Censorship 
In Hong Kong, the book is classified by the Obscene Articles Tribunal of Hong Kong under "Class II - indecent". Under such classification, the publisher must not distribute the book to people under the age of 18, and it must be sealed with printed warnings on the front and back covers. Public libraries are not allowed to lend the book to anyone under 18. Following the classification, the book was also removed from the shelves of the Hong Kong Book Fair.

The public responded by a petition, created using Google Forms and posted on Facebook by the group "The HK House of Literature", written jointly by 24 groups. The petition declared that the decision would "bring shame to Hong Kong people" and warned that it could hurt international standing of the city's publishing and cultural sectors. On July 26, 2018, the petition received 2,100 signatures.

Critical response 
The review aggregator website Book Marks reported that 36% of critics gave the book a "rave" review, whilst 14% of the critics "panned" the book. 50% of the critics expressed either "positive" (27%) or "mixed" (23%) impressions, based on a sample of 22 reviews.

Kirkus Reviews called the novel "altogether bizarre—and pleasingly beguiling, if demanding" and included it in its "Best Fiction of 2018" list.

Bradley Babendir from The A.V. Club criticized the book for lacking the "particular energy" that is seen through Murakami's other impressive stories, and that his "attempt to explore the artistic process, unfortunately, lacks insight."

Hari Kunzru from The New York Times felt like the story offered "promising mysteries", but there was a "sense of a writer throwing a lot of ideas against the wall in the hope that something will stick" and ultimately calling Killing Commendatore a "baggy monster" and a "disappointment from a writer who has made much better work."

Randy Rosenthal praised the book in his review for the Los Angeles Review of Books by writing, "By writing about metaphors and ideas, by ringing bells underground and animating two-foot-tall men, by having the desperate desires of others intrude on the simplest of plans and a whole lot else, Murakami is reminding us that the world is more enchanted than we might think."

References

External links 

 Petition to take down Hong Kong censorship of the novel on Google Forms

Novels by Haruki Murakami
2017 Japanese novels
Shinchosha books
Postmodern novels
Novels set in Japan